Chris Calhoun,  is a Korean War veteran, who was born in Opa-locka, Florida.

Biography
Calhoun was committed to a Florida State Hospital, Chattahoochee, located in Gadsden County in 1956 following a suicide attempt.  He suffered from what now is known as post-traumatic stress syndrome.  He was later released in 1962 after he spurred an investigation leading to state mental health care reforms.

While at Chattahoochee, Calhoun described the conditions inside the hospital as a hellish prison atmosphere through letters he wrote that were passed outside the hospital walls via visitors and friendly staff.  He wrote of events along the lines of how he had been raped by other patients, how staffers encouraged patients to fight with one another and then had subdued them by choking, and how at least seven patients had died while he was there.  Some of the patients died from the choking sessions.

The abuse eventually was exposed by The Tampa Tribune.  Governor Farris Bryant ordered an investigation that led to reforms in the early 1960s.

Calhoun moved to Los Angeles after his release.  He was then inspired to tell the world his experiences. He did maintenance work for a theater chain in hopes that he would be able to meet members of the film industry who could assist him in his movie and book goals.

He came to meet screenwriter James Hicks, who agreed to write a script. It was turned down by several major studios before being accepted by Hemdale Film Corporation, a small British-owned, Los Angeles-based company that also produced Platoon, Hoosiers, The Last Emperor, and Salvador.

In popular culture
The movie based on Chris Calhoun, entitled Chattahoochee, stars Dennis Hopper and Gary Oldman, who plays Emmitt Foley, a fictional character based on Calhoun. It appeared in theaters nationwide in 1990.

Chris Calhoun continues to provide a voice for the mentally ill through various channels.  He voices the need for hospitals to better care for the mentally ill.

References

External links
 http://freepages.genealogy.rootsweb.com/~chattahoochee/chriscalhoun.html
 http://freepages.genealogy.rootsweb.com/~chattahoochee/
 James Ponti, Journey Out Of Madness Chris Calhoun Thought Nothing Could Be More Horrible Than War Was. Then, In 1956, The Decorated Soldier Found Himself At Florida State Hospital In Chattahoochee, May 27, 1990.
Beth Duff Sanders, Mentally ill Criticize Film`s Violence, May 2, 1990

1934 births
Living people
People from Opa-locka, Florida